"Land of a Million Drums" is a song by the American hip hop duo OutKast featuring Killer Mike and Sleepy Brown, released on July 4, 2002. It is the first and only non-album single to be released by the duo. The song was featured on the soundtrack of the first live-action Scooby-Doo film.

The single was well-received in the United Kingdom, where it reached the 46th position on the 2002 singles charts. However, the song was not as successful in the United States, where it failed to chart. It is considered by some critics to be among the worst songs recorded by the group.

There is no fully uncensored version of this song. The version credited as the "Explicit Version" on both the CD singles and the 12 inch vinyl, that both carry a Parental Advisory sticker, is still partially censored and have the Scooby-Doo sound effects removed.

Track listings

UK single

EU single

12" single

Charts

References

Songs about drums
2001 songs
2002 singles
Music videos directed by Bryan Barber
Outkast songs
Arista Records singles
Songs written for films
Scooby-Doo music
Scooby-Doo (film series)